The Albatros C.IX was a two-seated German military reconnaissance biplane from 1917. It was built by Albatros Flugzeugwerke. It did not have a central strut between the upper wing and the fuselage, which was uncommon during the time. Also unusual was that the top wing was swept,  while the lower wing was straight.
Only three of these aircraft were built.

Manfred von Richthofen used one for personal transport, including going to meet Kaiser Wilhelm II in May 1917.

Specifications

Notes

References

(German) Kroschel/Stützer. Die deutschen Militärflugzeuge 1910-1918. 1977. .

C.09
1910s German military reconnaissance aircraft
Single-engined tractor aircraft
Aircraft first flown in 1917